Marek Ondrík (born 30 November 1990 in Ružomberok) is a Slovak football defender who currently plays for FK Inter Bratislava, on loan from MFK Ružomberok.

References

External links
at mfkruzomberok.sk 

1990 births
Living people
Slovak footballers
Association football defenders
MFK Ružomberok players
FK Inter Bratislava players
Slovak Super Liga players
Sportspeople from Ružomberok